The Bonnet Plume Formation is a Mesozoic geologic formation in Canada's Yukon territory. The thickness of the formation is known to be at least 1500 metres. The formation is composed of sedimentary rocks including conglomerate, sandstone, siltstone, mudstone and coal.

Dinosaur remains are among the fossils that have been recovered from the formation, although none have yet been referred to a specific genus.

References

 Weishampel, David B.; Dodson, Peter; and Osmólska, Halszka (eds.): The Dinosauria, 2nd, Berkeley: University of California Press. 861 pp. .

See also

 List of dinosaur-bearing rock formations
 List of stratigraphic units with indeterminate dinosaur fossils

Mesozoic Erathem of North America
Mesozoic Yukon
Stratigraphy of Yukon